The following units and commanders of the U.S. and Mexican armed forces fought in the battle of Cerro Gordo from April 17–18, 1847 during the Mexican–American War. The U.S. 1st Division and 1st Brigade, 3rd Division remained in the rear at Veracruz.

United States
Army of Invasion: MG Winfield Scott

Headquarters
 Acting Inspector General: Lt. Colonel Ethan Allen Hitchock
 Chief of Engineers: Major Smith
 Chief Topographical Engineer: Major William Turnbull
 Chief Quartermaster: Captain Allen

Mexico
Gen. div. Antonio Lopez de Santa Anna

As actually deployed
 Right – Gen. L. Pinzon – 5th Infantry, Atlixco Battalion (total 500 men) and one artillery battery (7 guns)
 Center – Navy Capt. B. Araujo – Libertad (400 men),and Zacapoastla (300 men) battalions and one artillery battery (8 guns)
 Left – Col. Badilo – Jalapa, Coatepec and Teusitlan National Guard companies (250 men) and one artillery battery (9 guns)
 Camp of Matamoros – Gen. Jarero – Matamoros and Tepeaca Battalions (450 men) and one gun

Battery on the road – Gen.br. R. Diaz de la Vega-6th Infantry (900 men), Grenaderos Battalion (460 men) and one Art. Battery (7 guns)

el Telegrafo (hill) – Gen.br. C. Vasquez, Col. Lopez Uraga, Col R.Palacios (artillery) – 3d Infantry (Col. Azpeitia 100 men) and one artillery battery (6 guns)

Reserve in Camp at Cerro Gordo- Gen.div. A. Lopez de Santa Ana – 1st, 2d, 3d (Gen. Banenili) & 4th Light (Ligero) (1,700 men), and 4th (Col. Lopez Uraga) & 11th Line (780 men). Artillery reserve (probably one battery of 5 guns),general park, hospital, baggage etc.

Cavalry at Coral Falso – Gen. V. Canalizo -Hussars Squadron, 5th & 9th Line Cavalry, Morelia & Coraceros Regiments, Jalapa, Chalchicomula and Orizava Squadrons. (Juvera and Canalizo Brigades?)

Notes:
 Manuel Balbontin, a Mexican artillery officer during the war (La Invasion Americana 1888) does not cover the battle.
 Mexican Artillery batteries usually had 4 guns. Batteries with larger guns had fewer than this. Guns were grouped together by size, i.e. a battery of 4 four pounders ( 4-4 lbs.), or a battery of 3 twelve pounders (3-12 lbs.) A total of 43 guns would indicate about 11 batteries. Col. L. Palacios was killed while commanding artillery. Naval Capt P. Ruiz y Baranda, Naval Lt. F. Fernandez, and Capt. V. Arguelles and Lts. M. Camacho, B. Arnable & J. R. Cobarrubias were all captured commanding artillery. Naval Capt. Godinez and artillery officers Malagon and Olzinger were also present. Battery commanders? Naval Capt. Araujo, above was probably a battery commander also. Or, about ten battery commanders.
 GMT Games (unsure of sources) posits Pinzon with 7 guns (1- 12 lbs., 2-8 lbs. and 4- 4 lbs. about two batteries), Araujo with 8 guns (4- 8 lbs. and 4- 4 lbs. about two batteries), Badillo with 9 guns (3- 8 lbs. and 6- 4 lbs. about two batteries), Diaz with 7 guns (4- 16 lbs. and 3- 8 lbs. about two batteries) Vasques with 4 guns (4- 4 lobs. one battery), Jarero with 5 guns (1- 8 lbs. and 4- 4 lbs. about one battery). Or about ten batteries.

References

Mexican–American War orders of battle